Ian Potter (1902–1994)  was an Australian stockbroker, businessman and philanthropist.

Ian Potter may also refer to:

 Ian Potter (cricketer) (born 1938), a former  English cricketer
 Ian Potter (rugby league) (born 1958), an English former professional rugby league footballer
 Ian Potter (writer), a British writer
 Ian Potter, Conservative councillor in Oakdale ward in Poole, Dorset, 2011 and 2015

See also
Ian Potter Centre: NGV Australia, an art gallery, part of the National Gallery Victoria, Melbourne, Australia
Ian Potter Museum of Art, an art gallery at the University of Melbourne, Australia
Ian Potter Sculpture Court, at the Monash University Museum of Art, Melbourne